The 2014 Glynhill Ladies International was held from 17 to 19 January at the Braehead Curling Rink in Glasgow, Scotland as part of the 2013–14 World Curling Tour. The event was held in a Round-robin tournament format, and the purse for the event was GBP£8,200, of which the winner, Wang Bingyu, received £2,500. Wang defeated Mirjam Ott in the final, stealing five points en route to a 9–4 victory.

Teams
The teams are listed as follows:

Standings

Preliminary round
Final Standings

Schenkel Round
Final Standings

Playoffs

References

External links
GLI Home Page

 
2014 in curling
International sports competitions in Glasgow
Women's curling competitions in Scotland
2014 in Scottish sport
January 2014 sports events in the United Kingdom